62 Pickup may refer to:

 "62 Pickup", a song on the 2005 album The Testament by Cormega
 "62 Pickup", an Emmy-nominated episode of The Facts of Life

See also
 52 pickup, a card game
 Pickup-56, a 2006 album by Lasse Stefanz